Tang Deshang (born April 2, 1991) is a Chinese weightlifter.

References

1991 births
Living people
World Weightlifting Championships medalists
Chinese male weightlifters
21st-century Chinese people